Three for Bedroom "C" (sometimes written as 3 for Bedroom "C") is a 1952 American comedy film released by Warner Brothers. It was directed by Milton H. Bren, who also wrote the screenplay. The film stars Gloria Swanson as an aging movie star. Music by Heinz Roemheld.

Background 
Riding high after the critical and financial success of Sunset Boulevard (1950), Swanson was offered more film roles.  According to her, they were all pale imitations of Norma Desmond, her character in the hit film.

Reluctant to accept the roles, in fear of being typecast as a faded actress, she agreed to be in Three for Bedroom "C" because it offered something different — it was a comedy. This was her first film in color, and she was also costume designer for the project. Swanson hoped to duplicate her previous success. Unfortunately, the film underperformed with critics and with audiences.

Plot
Ann Haven (Swanson), an aging movie actress, receives an urgent wire demanding that she immediately return to Hollywood to star in a new film.

She is not thrilled with the idea, but decides to go anyway.   She plans to leave New York for Los Angeles by train, bringing along her bold young daughter, Barbara (Janine Perreau).  
Unfortunately, the train is full so they have no choice but to stow away in a sleeping compartment.  
The berth belongs to a shy and introverted biochemistry professor from Harvard, Ollie J. Thrumm (James Warren).  He ends up boarding the train in Chicago.  Romance and complications ensue — including havoc from Ann's agent Johnny Pizer (Fred Clark, who was also in Sunset Blvd.).

Cast
 Gloria Swanson as Ann Haven
 James Warren as Professor Ollie J. Thruman
 Fred Clark as Johnny Pizer
 Hans Conreid as Press agent Jack Bleck
 Steve Brodie as Conde Marlowe
 Janine Perreau as Barbara Haven
 Margaret Dumont as Mrs. Agnes Hawthorne

External links 
 

1952 films
1952 comedy films
Films scored by Heinz Roemheld
Warner Bros. films
American comedy films
1950s English-language films
1950s American films